Apple Valley High School is the name of two high schools in the United States:
Apple Valley High School (California) 
Apple Valley High School (Minnesota)